Naturally occurring terbium (65Tb) is composed of one stable isotope, 159Tb. Thirty-seven radioisotopes have been characterized, with the most stable being 158Tb with a half-life of 180 years, 157Tb with a half-life of 71 years, and 160Tb with a half-life of 72.3 days. All of the remaining radioactive isotopes have half-lives that are less than 6.907 days, and the majority of these have half-lives that are less than 24 seconds. This element also has 27 meta states, with the most stable being 156m1Tb (t1/2 = 24.4 hours), 154m2Tb (t1/2 = 22.7 hours) and 154m1Tb (t1/2 = 9.4 hours).

The primary decay mode before the most abundant stable isotope, 159Tb, is electron capture, and the primary mode behind is beta decay. The primary decay products before 159Tb are element Gd (gadolinium) isotopes, and the primary products after 159Tb are element Dy (dysprosium) isotopes.

List of isotopes 

|-
| 135Tb
| style="text-align:right" | 65
| style="text-align:right" | 70
|
| 0.94(+33−22) ms
|
|
| (7/2−)
|
|
|-
| 136Tb
| style="text-align:right" | 65
| style="text-align:right" | 71
| 135.96138(64)#
| 0.2# s
|
|
|
|
|
|-
| 137Tb
| style="text-align:right" | 65
| style="text-align:right" | 72
| 136.95598(64)#
| 600# ms
|
|
| 11/2−#
|
|
|-
| rowspan=2|138Tb
| rowspan=2 style="text-align:right" | 65
| rowspan=2 style="text-align:right" | 73
| rowspan=2|137.95316(43)#
| rowspan=2|800# ms [>200 ns]
| β+
| 138Gd
| rowspan=2|
| rowspan=2|
| rowspan=2|
|-
| p
| 137Gd
|-
| 139Tb
| style="text-align:right" | 65
| style="text-align:right" | 74
| 138.94829(32)#
| 1.6(2) s
| β+
| 139Gd
| 11/2−#
|
|
|-
| rowspan=2|140Tb
| rowspan=2 style="text-align:right" | 65
| rowspan=2 style="text-align:right" | 75
| rowspan=2|139.94581(86)
| rowspan=2|2.4(2) s
| β+ (99.74%)
| 140Gd
| rowspan=2|5
| rowspan=2|
| rowspan=2|
|-
| β+, p (.26%)
| 139Eu
|-
| 141Tb
| style="text-align:right" | 65
| style="text-align:right" | 76
| 140.94145(11)
| 3.5(2) s
| β+
| 141Gd
| (5/2−)
|
|
|-
| style="text-indent:1em" | 141mTb
| colspan="3" style="text-indent:2em" | 0(200)# keV
| 7.9(6) s
| β+
| 141Gd
| 11/2−#
|
|
|-
| rowspan=2|142Tb
| rowspan=2 style="text-align:right" | 65
| rowspan=2 style="text-align:right" | 77
| rowspan=2|141.93874(32)#
| rowspan=2|597(17) ms
| β+
| 142Gd
| rowspan=2|1+
| rowspan=2|
| rowspan=2|
|-
| β+, p
| 141Eu
|-
| rowspan=2 style="text-indent:1em" | 142m1Tb
| rowspan=2 colspan="3" style="text-indent:2em" | 280.2(10) keV
| rowspan=2|303(17) ms
| IT (99.5%)
| 142Tb
| rowspan=2|(5−)
| rowspan=2|
| rowspan=2|
|-
| β+ (.5%)
| 142Gd
|-
| style="text-indent:1em" | 142m2Tb
| colspan="3" style="text-indent:2em" | 621.4(11) keV
| 15(4) µs
|
|
|
|
|
|-
| 143Tb
| style="text-align:right" | 65
| style="text-align:right" | 78
| 142.93512(6)
| 12(1) s
| β+
| 143Gd
| (11/2−)
|
|
|-
| style="text-indent:1em" | 143mTb
| colspan="3" style="text-indent:2em" | 0(100)# keV
| <21 s
| β+
| 143Gd
| 5/2+#
|
|
|-
| rowspan=2|144Tb
| rowspan=2 style="text-align:right" | 65
| rowspan=2 style="text-align:right" | 79
| rowspan=2|143.93305(3)
| rowspan=2|~1 s
| β+
| 144Gd
| rowspan=2|1+
| rowspan=2|
| rowspan=2|
|-
| β+, p (rare)
| 143Eu
|-
| rowspan=3 style="text-indent:1em" | 144m1Tb
| rowspan=3 colspan="3" style="text-indent:2em" | 396.9(5) keV
| rowspan=3|4.25(15) s
| IT (66%)
| 144Tb
| rowspan=3|(6−)
| rowspan=3|
| rowspan=3|
|-
| β+ (34%)
| 144Gd
|-
| β+, p (<1%)
| 143Eu
|-
| style="text-indent:1em" | 144m2Tb
| colspan="3" style="text-indent:2em" | 476.2(5) keV
| 2.8(3) µs
|
|
| (8−)
|
|
|-
| style="text-indent:1em" | 144m3Tb
| colspan="3" style="text-indent:2em" | 517.1(5) keV
| 670(60) ns
|
|
| (9+)
|
|
|-
| style="text-indent:1em" | 144m4Tb
| colspan="3" style="text-indent:2em" | 544.5(6) keV
| <300 ns
|
|
| (10+)
|
|
|-
| 145Tb
| style="text-align:right" | 65
| style="text-align:right" | 80
| 144.92927(6)
| 20# min
| β+
| 145Gd
| (3/2+)
|
|
|-
| style="text-indent:1em" | 145mTb
| colspan="3" style="text-indent:2em" | 0(100)# keV
| 30.9(7) s
| β+
| 145Gd
| (11/2−)
|
|
|-
| 146Tb
| style="text-align:right" | 65
| style="text-align:right" | 81
| 145.92725(5)
| 8(4) s
| β+
| 146Gd
| 1+
|
|
|-
| style="text-indent:1em" | 146m1Tb
| colspan="3" style="text-indent:2em" | 150(100)# keV
| 24.1(5) s
| β+
| 146Gd
| 5−
|
|
|-
| style="text-indent:1em" | 146m2Tb
| colspan="3" style="text-indent:2em" | 930(100)# keV
| 1.18(2) ms
|
|
| (10+)
|
|
|-
| 147Tb
| style="text-align:right" | 65
| style="text-align:right" | 82
| 146.924045(13)
| 1.64(3) h
| β+
| 147Gd
| 1/2+#
|
|
|-
| style="text-indent:1em" | 147mTb
| colspan="3" style="text-indent:2em" | 50.6(9) keV
| 1.87(5) min
| β+
| 147Gd
| (11/2)−
|
|
|-
| 148Tb
| style="text-align:right" | 65
| style="text-align:right" | 83
| 147.924272(15)
| 60(1) min
| β+
| 148Gd
| 2−
|
|
|-
| style="text-indent:1em" | 148m1Tb
| colspan="3" style="text-indent:2em" | 90.1(3) keV
| 2.20(5) min
| β+
| 148Gd
| (9)+
|
|
|-
| style="text-indent:1em" | 148m2Tb
| colspan="3" style="text-indent:2em" | 8618.6(10) keV
| 1.310(7) µs
|
|
| (27+)
|
|
|-
| rowspan=2|149Tb
| rowspan=2 style="text-align:right" | 65
| rowspan=2 style="text-align:right" | 84
| rowspan=2|148.923246(5)
| rowspan=2|4.118(25) h
| β+ (83.3%)
| 149Gd
| rowspan=2|1/2+
| rowspan=2|
| rowspan=2|
|-
| α (16.7%)
| 145Eu
|-
| rowspan=2 style="text-indent:1em" | 149mTb
| rowspan=2 colspan="3" style="text-indent:2em" | 35.78(13) keV
| rowspan=2|4.16(4) min
| β+ (99.97%)
| 149Gd
| rowspan=2|11/2−
| rowspan=2|
| rowspan=2|
|-
| α (.022%)
| 145Eu
|-
| rowspan=2|150Tb
| rowspan=2 style="text-align:right" | 65
| rowspan=2 style="text-align:right" | 85
| rowspan=2|149.923660(8)
| rowspan=2|3.48(16) h
| β+ (99.95%)
| 150Gd
| rowspan=2|(2−)
| rowspan=2|
| rowspan=2|
|-
| α (.05%)
| 146Eu
|-
| rowspan=2 style="text-indent:1em" | 150mTb
| rowspan=2 colspan="3" style="text-indent:2em" | 457(29) keV
| rowspan=2|5.8(2) min
| β+
| 150Gd
| rowspan=2|9+
| rowspan=2|
| rowspan=2|
|-
| IT (rare)
| 150Tb
|-
| rowspan=2|151Tb
| rowspan=2 style="text-align:right" | 65
| rowspan=2 style="text-align:right" | 86
| rowspan=2|150.923103(5)
| rowspan=2|17.609(1) h
| β+ (99.99%)
| 151Gd
| rowspan=2|1/2(+)
| rowspan=2|
| rowspan=2|
|-
| α (.0095%)
| 147Eu
|-
| rowspan=2 style="text-indent:1em" | 151mTb
| rowspan=2 colspan="3" style="text-indent:2em" | 99.54(6) keV
| rowspan=2|25(3) s
| IT (93.8%)
| 151Tb
| rowspan=2|(11/2−)
| rowspan=2|
| rowspan=2|
|-
| β+ (6.2%)
| 151Gd
|-
| rowspan=2|152Tb
| rowspan=2 style="text-align:right" | 65
| rowspan=2 style="text-align:right" | 87
| rowspan=2|151.92407(4)
| rowspan=2|17.5(1) h
| β+
| 152Gd
| rowspan=2|2−
| rowspan=2|
| rowspan=2|
|-
| α (7×10−7%)
| 148Eu
|-
| style="text-indent:1em" | 152m1Tb
| colspan="3" style="text-indent:2em" | 342.15(16) keV
| 0.96 µs
|
|
| 5−
|
|
|-
| rowspan=2 style="text-indent:1em" | 152m2Tb
| rowspan=2 colspan="3" style="text-indent:2em" | 501.74(19) keV
| rowspan=2|4.2(1) min
| IT (78.8%)
| 152Tb
| rowspan=2|8+
| rowspan=2|
| rowspan=2|
|-
| β+ (21.2%)
| 152Gd
|-
| 153Tb
| style="text-align:right" | 65
| style="text-align:right" | 88
| 152.923435(5)
| 2.34(1) d
| β+
| 153Gd
| 5/2+
|
|
|-
| style="text-indent:1em" | 153mTb
| colspan="3" style="text-indent:2em" | 163.175(5) keV
| 186(4) µs
|
|
| 11/2−
|
|
|-
| rowspan=2|154Tb
| rowspan=2 style="text-align:right" | 65
| rowspan=2 style="text-align:right" | 89
| rowspan=2|153.92468(5)
| rowspan=2|21.5(4) h
| β+ (99.9%)
| 154Gd
| rowspan=2|0(+#)
| rowspan=2|
| rowspan=2|
|-
| β− (.1%)
| 154Dy
|-
| rowspan=3 style="text-indent:1em" | 154m1Tb
| rowspan=3 colspan="3" style="text-indent:2em" | 12(7) keV
| rowspan=3|9.4(4) h
| β+ (78.2%)
| 154Gd
| rowspan=3|3−
| rowspan=3|
| rowspan=3|
|-
| IT (21.8%)
| 154Tb
|-
| β− (.1%)
| 154Dy
|-
| style="text-indent:1em" | 154m2Tb
| colspan="3" style="text-indent:2em" | 200(150)# keV
| 22.7(5) h
|
|
| 7−
|
|
|-
| style="text-indent:1em" | 154m3Tb
| colspan="3" style="text-indent:2em" | 0+Z keV
| 513(42) ns
|
|
|
|
|
|-
| 155Tb
| style="text-align:right" | 65
| style="text-align:right" | 90
| 154.923505(13)
| 5.32(6) d
| EC
| 155Gd
| 3/2+
|
|
|-
| rowspan=2|156Tb
| rowspan=2 style="text-align:right" | 65
| rowspan=2 style="text-align:right" | 91
| rowspan=2|155.924747(5)
| rowspan=2|5.35(10) d
| β+
| 156Gd
| rowspan=2|3−
| rowspan=2|
| rowspan=2|
|-
| β− (rare)
| 156Dy
|-
| style="text-indent:1em" | 156m1Tb
| colspan="3" style="text-indent:2em" | 54(3) keV
| 24.4(10) h
| IT
| 156Tb
| (7−)
|
|
|-
| style="text-indent:1em" | 156m2Tb
| colspan="3" style="text-indent:2em" | 88.4(2) keV
| 5.3(2) h
|
|
| (0+)
|
|
|-
| 157Tb
| style="text-align:right" | 65
| style="text-align:right" | 92
| 156.9240246(27)
| 71(7) y
| EC
| 157Gd
| 3/2+
|
|
|-
| rowspan=2|158Tb
| rowspan=2 style="text-align:right" | 65
| rowspan=2 style="text-align:right" | 93
| rowspan=2|157.9254131(28)
| rowspan=2|180(11) y
| β+ (83.4%)
| 158Gd
| rowspan=2|3−
| rowspan=2|
| rowspan=2|
|-
| β− (16.6%)
| 158Dy
|-
| rowspan=3 style="text-indent:1em" | 158m1Tb
| rowspan=3 colspan="3" style="text-indent:2em" | 110.3(12) keV
| rowspan=3|10.70(17) s
| IT (99.39%)
| 158Tb
| rowspan=3|0−
| rowspan=3|
| rowspan=3|
|-
| β− (.6%)
| 158Dy
|-
| β+ (.01%)
| 158Gd
|-
| style="text-indent:1em" | 158m2Tb
| colspan="3" style="text-indent:2em" | 388.37(15) keV
| 0.40(4) ms
|
|
| 7−
|
|
|-
| 159Tb
| style="text-align:right" | 65
| style="text-align:right" | 94
| 158.9253468(27)
| colspan=3 align=center|Stable
| 3/2+
| 1.0000
|
|-
| 160Tb
| style="text-align:right" | 65
| style="text-align:right" | 95
| 159.9271676(27)
| 72.3(2) d
| β−
| 160Dy
| 3−
|
|
|-
| 161Tb
| style="text-align:right" | 65
| style="text-align:right" | 96
| 160.9275699(28)
| 6.906(19) d
| β−
| 161Dy
| 3/2+
|
|
|-
| 162Tb
| style="text-align:right" | 65
| style="text-align:right" | 97
| 161.92949(4)
| 7.60(15) min
| β−
| 162Dy
| 1−
|
|
|-
| 163Tb
| style="text-align:right" | 65
| style="text-align:right" | 98
| 162.930648(5)
| 19.5(3) min
| β−
| 163Dy
| 3/2+
|
|
|-
| 164Tb
| style="text-align:right" | 65
| style="text-align:right" | 99
| 163.93335(11)
| 3.0(1) min
| β−
| 164Dy
| (5+)
|
|
|-
| 165Tb
| style="text-align:right" | 65
| style="text-align:right" | 100
| 164.93488(21)#
| 2.11(10) min
| β−
| 165mDy
| 3/2+#
|
|
|-
| 166Tb
| style="text-align:right" | 65
| style="text-align:right" | 101
| 165.93799(11)
| 25.6(22) s
| β−
| 166Dy
|
|
|
|-
| 167Tb
| style="text-align:right" | 65
| style="text-align:right" | 102
| 166.94005(43)#
| 19.4(27) s
| β−
| 167Dy
| 3/2+#
|
|
|-
| 168Tb
| style="text-align:right" | 65
| style="text-align:right" | 103
| 167.94364(54)#
| 8.2(13) s
| β−
| 168Dy
| 4−#
|
|
|-
| 169Tb
| style="text-align:right" | 65
| style="text-align:right" | 104
| 168.94622(64)#
| 5.13(32) s
| β−
| 169Dy
| 3/2+#
|
|
|-
| 170Tb
| style="text-align:right" | 65
| style="text-align:right" | 105
| 169.95025(75)#
| 960(78) ms
| β−
| 170Dy
|
|
|
|-
| 171Tb
| style="text-align:right" | 65
| style="text-align:right" | 106
| 170.95330(86)#
| 1.23(10) s
| β−
| 171Dy
| 3/2+#
|
|
|-
| 172Tb
| style="text-align:right" | 65
| style="text-align:right" | 107
| 
| 760(190) ms
| β−
| 172Dy
| 6+#
|
|

References 

 Isotope masses from:

 Isotopic compositions and standard atomic masses from:

 Half-life, spin, and isomer data selected from the following sources.

 
Terbium
Terbium